is a passenger railway station in located in the city of Hirakata, Osaka Prefecture, Japan, operated by West Japan Railway Company (JR West).

Lines

Station layout
The station has a two elevated island platforms with the station building underneath. Only the middle platforms are in use, with the outer platforms on dead-headed sidings. The station is staffed.

Platforms

Adjacent stations

History
The station was opened on 12 April 1898. 

Station numbering was introduced in March 2018 with Tsuda being assigned station number JR-H29.

Passenger statistics
In fiscal 2019, the station was used by an average of 5,646 passengers daily (boarding passengers only).

Surrounding area
 Japan National Route 307
Hirakata City Tsuda Elementary School
Hirakata City Tsuda Minami Elementary School

References

External links

 Official home page 

Railway stations in Japan opened in 1898
Railway stations in Osaka Prefecture
Hirakata, Osaka